Roxanne (born Dolores Rosedale; March 20, 1928) is an American former model and actress.

Born in Minneapolis, Minnesota, Roxanne is the daughter of Kenneth and Thyra Rosedale. She studied fashion design at the Minneapolis School of Art and was a member of the Minneapolis Models Guild.

She was the beautiful blonde assistant on the Bud Collyer-hosted original version of the Goodson-Todman Productions game show Beat the Clock. Roxanne was replaced by Beverly Bentley in August 1955. She gave birth to her daughter Ann in December 1955. Roxanne did not use a surname in her professional work.

Roxanne had a doll fashioned after her which was called, naturally, The Roxanne Doll. It was a hard plastic doll which stood 18 inches (46 cm) tall. It had movable legs which allowed the doll to "walk". They were manufactured circa 1953 by the Valentine Company. The blue-eyed doll had a Beat the Clock tag on the doll's wrist and came with a miniature red camera. Roxanne would give these dolls to the contestants' daughters on Beat the Clock.

Roxanne made her dramatic TV debut on April 23, 1952, in the "Double Entry" episode of Casey, Crime Photographer. She also appeared in a small role in Billy Wilder's The Seven Year Itch (1955).

On March 13, 1954, Roxanne married finance executive Tom Roddy in New York. As of February 2015, Roxanne was living in Minneapolis, Minnesota.

Filmography

References

External links
Roxanne (born Dolores Rosedale) - Star of Beat The Clock

Roxanne Rosedale ~ The Beat The Clock Model

1928 births
American film actresses
American television personalities
American women television personalities
Game show models
Living people
Actresses from Minneapolis
21st-century American women